JoLynn Garnes is an American film editor.  She has edited feature documentaries, music videos, and TV commercials.

Garnes's best-known work is the critically acclaimed documentary film The Fearless Freaks, about American rock band The Flaming Lips.  Other documentary films edited by JoLynn include Summercamp! and All Dolled Up: A New York Dolls Story.

Garnes has also edited several music videos for artists including Beyoncé, Prince, Low, Mojave 3, Hilary Duff, Bon Iver, and The Flaming Lips.

References

External links
 Official site
 Official website for "The Fearless Freaks"
 Official website for "Summercamp!"
 JoLynn Garnes IMDB

Living people
American film editors
Year of birth missing (living people)